Bagropsis reinhardti is a species of long-whiskered catfish. It is considered a threatened species by Brazil's Ministry of the Environment.

Bagropsis is classified under the "Calophysus-Pimelodus clade". Within this clade, it is considered a part of the "Pimelodus-group" of Pimelodids, which also includes Pimelodus, Exallodontus, Duopalatinus, Cheirocerus, Iheringichthys, Bergiaria, Parapimelodus, Platysilurus, Platystomatichthys, and Propimelodus.

References

Pimelodidae
Fish of the São Francisco River basin

Fish described in 1874
Endemic fauna of Brazil
Taxa named by Christian Frederik Lütken